Elizabeth J. "Beth" Kerttula (born January 8, 1956) is a Democratic former member of the Alaska House of Representatives, representing the 3rd District from 1998 to her resignation at the start of the legislative session in 2014. Sam Kito III was appointed to serve the remainder of her term. She served as the House Minority Leader from 2006 until her resignation, when she was succeeded by Chris Tuck. She resigned on the first day of the 2014 legislative session to accept a fellowship at the Center for Ocean Solutions at Stanford University, her alma mater. She was appointed as Director of the National Oceans Council, under President Barack Obama, on June 5, 2014. She was the daughter of Joyce and state senator Jalmar M. Kerttula. Her father represented the Matanuska-Susitna Valley (and at one point, also the Copper River valley and Valdez) in the Alaska legislature for most of the period between 1961 and 1995 and served as the Senate President.

References

External links
 Alaska State Legislature – Representative Beth Kerttula official government website
 Project Vote Smart – Representative Elizabeth J. 'Beth' Kerttula (AK) profile
 Follow the Money – Beth Kerttula
 2006 2004 2002 2000 1998 campaign contributions
 Alaska's Democratic Caucus – Beth Kerttula profile
 Beth Kerttula at 100 Years of Alaska's Legislature

1956 births
People from Guthrie, Oklahoma
Politicians from Juneau, Alaska
People from Matanuska-Susitna Borough, Alaska
Alaska lawyers
American people of Finnish descent
Living people
Democratic Party members of the Alaska House of Representatives
Women state legislators in Alaska
American women lawyers
21st-century American politicians
21st-century American women politicians
20th-century American politicians
20th-century American women politicians